In banking, the term national bank carries several meanings:

 a bank owned by the state
 an ordinary private bank which operates nationally (as opposed to regionally or locally or even internationally)
 in the United States, an ordinary private bank operating within a specific regulatory structure, which may or may not operate nationally, under the supervision of the Office of the Comptroller of the Currency.

In the past, the term "national bank" has been used synonymously with "central bank", but it is no longer used in this sense today. Some central banks may have the words "National Bank" in their name; conversely if a bank is named in this way, it is not automatically considered a central bank. For example, National Bank of Canada of Montreal, Canada, is a privately owned commercial bank. On the other hand, National Bank of Ethiopia is the central bank of Ethiopia and National Bank of Cambodia is the central bank of Cambodia.

By country

Afghanistan
Pashtany Bank is the government-owned bank in based in Kabul that controls Da Afghanistan Bank as well as the Afghan National Bank.

Argentina
Argentina's national bank is the Banco de la Nación Argentina, founded in 1891.

Australia
The Commonwealth Bank of Australia was founded by an Australian Act of Parliament in 1911. Bank Nationalisation was the policy of the Andrew Fisher Labor Government. In a rare move for the time, the bank was to have both savings and general bank business. The bank was also the first bank in Australia to receive a Federal Government guarantee.

In 1958 and 1959, there was a controversy concerning the dual function of the bank as the central bank on the one hand and a general bank on the other. As a result of this, the bank was split, giving the reserve bank function to the Reserve Bank of Australia and the general bank function to the Commonwealth Banking Corporation.

The Commonwealth bank was privatised in the 1990s by the Keating Labor government. As of 2016, it is one of the big four banks, along with the National Australia Bank which has always been privately owned.

Bulgaria
Bulgarian National Bank is the central bank of Bulgaria, founded in 1879 and it is the 13 oldest central bank in the world.

Canada
For Canada's central bank see Bank of Canada. The National Bank of Canada is a privately owned bank unrelated to the central bank.

Chile
The national bank in Chile is BancoEstado. It was created in 1953 by merging several state-owned financial institutions. The bank operates in competition with private banks but in addition to profitability its goals include having a positive social impact.

Colombia
The national bank in Colombia is the Bank of the Republic. Its primary role is to control the flow of money inside and outside the country and to issue the Colombian currency, the peso.

Denmark
Danmarks Nationalbank is the central bank of the Kingdom of Denmark.

India
India's central bank is the Reserve Bank of India.
There are 12 Public sector banks in which the majority stake is held by the Government of India. The largest of these by market capitalisation and market share is the State Bank of India.

Public Sector Banks (Government Shareholding %, as at end-June 2021)

State Bank of India (55.0%)
Bank of Baroda (64.0%)
Canara Bank (69.33%)
Punjab National Bank (73.1%)
Indian Bank (78.86%)
Union Bank of India (83.5%)
Bank of India (81.41%)
Central Bank of India (93.08%)
Bank of Maharashtra (93.33%)
UCO Bank (95.39%)
Indian Overseas Bank (96.4%)
Punjab and Sind Bank (98.07%)

Iran
Iran's national bank is Central Bank of the Islamic Republic of Iran (CBI) (Bank Markazi Jomhouri Islami Iran).
It was established in 1960.
National Bank of Iran is a large state commercial bank.

Kenya
National Bank of Kenya is a commercial bank founded in 1968. Its shares are listed on the Nairobi Stock Exchange and are majority owned (70%) jointly by the Government of Kenya and by the state owned National Social Security Fund of Kenya.

New Zealand
New Zealand currently has one state-owned bank, Kiwibank, established in 2001.

The New Zealand government formerly owned two other banks in New Zealand: The Bank of New Zealand, from 1945 to 1992 when it was privatised and sold, and Post Office Savings Bank, which was created as a separate entity with the privatisation of New Zealand Post. PostBank was sold to ANZ New Zealand in 1989.

The National Bank of New Zealand was a retail bank which, in 2003, was purchased by ANZ from its former owner, Lloyds TSB. In 2013 it was rebranded as ANZ.

Pakistan
National Bank of Pakistan is a major bank in Pakistan.

Palestine
The National Bank TNB is the leading bank in Palestine.

Serbia
National Bank of Serbia is the state-owned central bank in Serbia which regulates the currency Serbian dinar.

South Africa
First National Bank (South Africa) is a commercial bank and is one of the "Big Four" banks in South Africa.

United States

In the United States, the term national bank originally referred to the Revolutionary War–era Bank of North America, its successor, the First Bank of the United States, or that institution's successor, the Second Bank of the United States. The first survives as an acquisition of Wells Fargo, while the others are defunct.

In the modern United States, the term national bank has a precise meaning: a banking institution chartered and supervised by the Office of the Comptroller of the Currency ("OCC"), an agency in the U.S. Treasury Department, pursuant to the National Bank Act. Inclusion in the bank's name of the word National, the designation National Association, or its abbreviation N.A. is a required part of the distinguishing legal title of a national bank, as in "Farmers National Bank" or "Citibank, N.A." Many state banks, by contrast, are chartered by the applicable state government agencies (usually the state's department of banking). The Federal Deposit Insurance Corporation (FDIC) insures deposits at both national and state banks.

The advantage of holding a National Bank Act charter is that a national bank is not subject to state usury laws intended to prevent predatory lending. (However, see also Cuomo v. Clearing House Association, L. L. C., stating that federal banking regulations do not preempt the ability of states to enforce their own fair-lending laws.) There is currently no federal cap on rates. The federal government only requires that whatever rates, fees, or terms are set by issuers be disclosed to the consumer in accordance with the Truth in Lending Act.

Notwithstanding the name, many national banks do not have nationwide operations. Many have operations in only one city, county, or state.  This is because of the McFadden Act of 1927, which prohibited interstate branching by national banks. That restriction was not lifted until Congress enacted the Riegle-Neal Interstate Banking and Branching Efficiency Act of 1994.  In August 2021, Chase Bank became the first national bank to establish a retail presence in all 48 states of the contiguous United States.

National banks should also be distinguished from federal savings associations, including federal savings and loans and federal savings banks, which are financial institutions chartered by the Office of Thrift Supervision, an agency of the U.S. Treasury Department that was merged with the Office of the Comptroller of the Currency on 21 July 2012.

The Federal Reserve is the central bank of the United States; it is not a national bank but rather a unique system of institutions specially chartered by Congress to serve in this capacity.

References

External links
Alexander Hamilton: for the bank (February 23, 1791)
James Madison Debates the Constitutionality of a National Bank

Banks
Banking terms
Monetary reform
National institutions